Jim Cohen (born August 6, 1942) is an American human rights activist, attorney, environmentalist, and former candidate for the United States Senate seat from Minnesota then held by Republican Norm Coleman.  Cohen sought the endorsement of the Minnesota Democratic-Farmer-Labor Party, but withdrew his candidacy after trailing far behind Al Franken, who subsequently was elected U.S. Senator. Following his withdrawal, in 2008-09 Jim created Access Justice a nonprofit(501(c)(3)),(501(a)(2)), public interest law firm dedicated to providing "low-bono" legal services to low and moderate income working families. See AccessJustice.net

Student and educator

Cohen graduated with honors from Cornell University and received his law degree from the University of Michigan Law School. He has taught in public and private schools in Minneapolis; and once served as board member of the Continuum Academy, a planned charter school in Minneapolis. His term on the board was short-lived, and the school subsequently opened under the name Quest Academy.

Environmental leadership
Cohen has led two environmental organizations. He was the first director of the Washington, D.C. office of the Sierra Club Legal Defense Fund (now Earth Justice), which is based in San Francisco. Cohen subsequently organized the Environmental Task Force (ETF), a national organization that assisted local groups in their efforts to protect the environment in the 1980s. ETF was subsequently subsumed by another NGO called Environmental Action. Information on ETF is unavailable on the internet.

External links
 Jim Cohen for U.S. Senate Campaign Website
 Profile at SourceWatch

News Articles
 Pioneer Press: Cohen joins US Senate race
 Star Tribune: DFL Senate pack gets more crowded as Jim Cohen decides to join '08 race
 Kare 11: Another democrat wants Sen. Coleman's job
 Boston Globe: Lawyer, activist joins DFL Senate field

1942 births
Cornell University alumni
Living people
University of Michigan Law School alumni